Dexter Jackson (born March 19, 1988) is an American football linebacker who is currently a free agent. He played college football at the Bethune–Cookman University and attended Edward H. White High School in Jacksonville, Florida. He has also been a member of the Milwaukee Mustangs, Orlando Predators, Tampa Bay Storm and Jacksonville Sharks.

Early life
Jackson attended Edward H. White High School.

College career
Jackson attended Bethune–Cookman University from 2006 to 2009, where he was a Second Team All-Mid-Eastern Athletic Conference selection as a defensive lineman.

Professional career

Milwaukee Mustangs
On December 12, 2010, Jackson was assigned to the Milwaukee Mustangs. Jackson was again assigned to the Mustangs on October 12, 2011. On April 16, 2012, Jackson was placed on reassignment.

San Jose SaberCats
On April 18, 2012, Jackson was traded to the San Jose SaberCats for future considerations. Jackson finished the season injured reserve.

Orlando Predators
Jackson was assigned to the Orlando Predators on a two-year deal prior to the 2013 season. Jackson was reassigned on May 16, 2013, but was assigned again to the Predators on May 23, 2013.

Tampa Bay Storm
Jackson was assigned to the Tampa Bay Storm for the 2014 season, and started every game he was active in 2014 and 2015.

Jacksonville Sharks
In March 2016, Jackson was assigned to the Jacksonville Sharks. Jackson was named Second Team All-Arena at the conclusion of the season.

Return to Tampa Bay
In January 2017, Jackson returned to the Storm. The Storm folded in December 2017.

Baltimore Brigade
On March 22, 2018, Jackson was assigned to the Baltimore Brigade.

Personal life
He is the son of bodybuilder Dexter Jackson.

References

External links

Living people
1988 births
Players of American football from Jacksonville, Florida
Edward H. White High School alumni
American football defensive linemen
Bethune–Cookman Wildcats football players
Milwaukee Mustangs (2009–2012) players
San Jose SaberCats players
Orlando Predators players
Tampa Bay Storm players
Jacksonville Sharks players
Baltimore Brigade players